Savitri Brata (also Savitri Vrata) or Savitri Amavasya is a fasting day observed by married Hindu women on the Amavasya, the no moon day in month of Jyeshtha. It is celebrated in the Indian states of Odisha, Bihar, Uttar Pradesh and in Nepal.

Married Hindu women whose husbands are alive observe it as a vow with great dedication and pray for their husband to have a long life. The word reflects the origin and significance of the Vat-Savitri puja. The fast is dedicated to Savitri, who saved her husband Satyavan from being taken by the death god. 

The same festival is observed on Vat Purnima, the full moon of Jyestha in other regions including Maharashtra, Goa, Gujarat, Karnataka.

Legend behind the festival

The vrata was named after Savitri, the beautiful daughter of King Aswapati of Madra Desa. She selected Satyavan, a prince in exile who was living in the forest with his blind father Dyumatsen, as her life partner. She left the palace and lived with her husband and the in-laws in the forest. As a devoted wife and daughter-in-law, she went to great lengths to take care of them. One day while cutting wood in the jungle, Satyavan's head reeled and he fell down from a tree. Then Yama, the death God, appeared to take away Satyavan's soul. Deeply hurt, Savitri pleaded to Yamraj not to be separated from her husband. If anything, he would take away the soul of her husband and she would also follow. Yamraj, moved by the devotion of Savitri, returned the life of her husband. Soon Satyavan regained his lost kingdom.

Customs and rituals
All Hindu women observe this festival by worshiping and propitiating Savitri as a Devi. In the early morning, women take purifying baths, wear new clothes and bangles, and apply vermilion to their foreheads. Nine types of fruits and nine types of flowers are offered to the Goddess. Wet pulses, rice, mangos, jackfruits, palm fruits, kendu, bananas and several other fruits are offered as Bhoga (offering) and observe the festival with Savitri vrata katha. After fasting for the whole day, the fasting is over and the women have the Bhoga. In the afternoon, when formalities of worship are over, they bow to their husbands and elderly people.

See also
 Karva Chauth

References

External links
 Festivals of Orissa 

Hindu festivals
May observances
June observances
Culture of Mithila
Culture of Odisha
Religious festivals in India
Hindu festivals in Nepal
Vrata
Savitri and Satyavan